Terrence O'Hara (December 25, 1945 – December 5, 2022) was an American film and television director and actor. He worked on Smallville, CSI: Crime Scene Investigation, Voyagers!, NCIS, and other programs. He was married to television actress Shanna Reed.

O'Hara died from cancer on December 5, 2022 at age 76.

Partial filmography

Director
 Grimm
 Dollhouse (2010)
 NCIS: Los Angeles (2009–2022)
 The Blacklist (2015–2019)
 The Unit (2009)
 Sons of Anarchy (2008)
 CSI: Crime Scene Investigation (2005–2006)
 NCIS (2003–2022)
 Angel (2002–2004)
 The Shield (2003 & 2008)
 Smallville (2001–2007)
 JAG (1999-2004)
 Lie to Me (2009)
 Dr. Quinn, Medicine Woman

Actor
 Ryan's Hope (1978)
 Mrs. Columbo (1979)
 The Greatest American Hero (1982)
 Voyagers! (1982)

References

External links
 

1945 births
2022 deaths
American male film actors
American film directors
American male television actors
American television directors
Place of birth missing